Ulery Mill was a historic building in Marianna, Pennsylvania, United States.  It has been demolished.

It is designated as a historic residential landmark/farmstead by the Washington County History & Landmarks Foundation.

References

External links
[ National Register nomination form]

Grinding mills on the National Register of Historic Places in Pennsylvania
Buildings and structures in Washington County, Pennsylvania
Grinding mills in Pennsylvania
Industrial buildings completed in 1835
National Register of Historic Places in Washington County, Pennsylvania